Friday Night in Dixie is the fourth studio album by American country music artist Rhett Akins. It was released in 2002 on Audium Entertainment/Koch Records.  The album produced two singles in "Highway Sunrise" and "In Your Love", which peaked at #55 and #57 respectively on the Billboard country singles charts. Also included is an acoustic rendition of Akins' 1995 single "That Ain't My Truck".
The title track and "Must Be Livin' Right" were both re-recorded for his 2007 self-released album "People Like Me."

Track listing

Personnel
Rhett Akins- lead vocals 
Mike Brignardello- bass guitar
Larry Byrom- acoustic guitar, electric guitar
Dan Dugmore- electric guitar, steel guitar, slide guitar
Glen Duncan- fiddle
Tom Flora- background vocals
John Gardner- percussion
Brian Gary- Hammond organ
Tony Harrell- Hammond organ, piano
Steve Hinson- steel guitar
Jeff King- banjo, electric guitar
Troy Lancaster- electric guitar
Anthony Little- programming
Chris McHugh- drums
Greg Morrow- drums, percussion
Mike Noble- acoustic guitar
Kim Parent- background vocals
Darryl Preston- acoustic guitar, electric guitar
Michael Rhodes- bass guitar
Mike Rojas- keyboards
W. David Smith- acoustic bass guitar
Michael Spriggs- acoustic guitar
Russell Terrell- background vocals
Wanda Vick- banjo, fiddle, mandolin
Charlie Whitten- dobro, lap steel guitar

Chart performance

References

2002 albums
Rhett Akins albums
E1 Music albums